Leonardas Abramavičius (Leonhard Abramavicius) (died 1960 in Kaunas) was a Lithuanian chess player.

Biography
Abramavičius played for Lithuania in four official and one unofficial Chess Olympiads. 
 In July 1930, he played at fourth board at 3rd Chess Olympiad in Hamburg (+4 –11 =0).
 In July 1931, he played at fourth board at 4th Chess Olympiad in Prague (+3 –7 =1).
 In July 1933, he played at reserve board at 5th Chess Olympiad in Folkestone (+5 –2 =2).
 In August/September 1936, he played at fifth board at 3rd unofficial Chess Olympiad in Munich (+6 –8 =6).
 In July/August 1937, he played at reserve board at 7th Chess Olympiad in Stockholm (+2 –1 =0).
He won one individual silver medal in 1933.

Abramavičius played several times in Lithuanian Chess Championships. In July 1943, he tied for 1st-3rd with Birmanas and Romanas Arlauskas, (Abramavičius took 3rd in play-off), in Vilnius (12th LTU-ch). In 1947, he took 12th, in 1948 tied for 8-9th, in 1949 tied for 13-14th, in 1950 he won with Ratmir Kholmov (Cholmovas), in 1951 tied for 14-15th, in 1954 tied for 5-6th, in 1955 tied for 6-7th, and in 1957 took 12th place.

Notable chess games 
Leonardas Abramavičius vs Victor Kahn (FRA), Prague 1931, 4th Olympiad, Bogo-Indian, E11, 1-0
Kornél Havasi (HUN) vs Leonardas Abramavičius, Folkestone 1933, 5th Olympiad, King's Indian, Fianchetto, E67, 0-1
Gedeon Barcza (HUN) vs Leonardas Abramavičius, Munich 1936 (ol), King’s Indian, Sämich Variation, E85, 0-1
Leonardas Abramavičius vs Vladas Mikenas, Vilnius 1955, LTU-ch, Ruy Lopez, Closed, C84, 1-0

References

External links

Year of birth missing
1960 deaths
Lithuanian chess players
Chess Olympiad competitors